The 2019–20 FC Ufa season was their sixth successive season in the Russian Premier League, the highest tier of association football in Russia, and seventh in total.

Season review
On 17 March, the Russian Premier League postponed all league fixtures until April 10th due to the COVID-19 pandemic.

On 1 April, the Russian Football Union extended the suspension of football until 31 May.

On 15 May, the Russian Football Union announced that the Russian Premier League season would resume on 21 June.

Squad

Out on loan

Transfers

In

Loans in

Out

Loans out

Released

Friendlies

Competitions

Premier League

Results by round

Results

League table

Russian Cup

Squad statistics

Appearances and goals

|-
|colspan="14"|Players away from the club on loan:

|-
|colspan="14"|Players who appeared for Ufa but left during the season:

|}

Goal scorers

Clean sheets

Disciplinary record

References

External links

FC Ufa seasons
Ufa